Chimera is a British science-fiction horror drama made by Zenith Productions and Anglia Films for ITV in 1991. It is based on the 1982 novel of the same name about genetic engineering by Stephen Gallagher. Gallagher had previously adapted the novel as a 90 minute dramatised audio drama for BBC Radio 4 in 1985. The theme music of the TV mini-series was "Roisin Dubh" by Nigel Hess and Chameleon.

Although set in rural Cumbria, filming took place in North Yorkshire with the village of Kettlewell providing the outdoor scenes. The setting for The Jenner Clinic was the nearby Malham Tarn Field Studies Centre, a Grade II listed Georgian country house owned by the National Trust. Studio filming took place at Shepperton Studios in Surrey.

The series was later re-edited for release in the United States, and retitled Monkey Boy.

Plot
The story focuses upon Chad, a young half-boy, half-chimp, developed by scientists as part of a top secret government operation. However, Chad becomes aggressive, strong and uncontrollable, with the inability to communicate on a human level, escaping from the lab, brutally killing several nurses and scientists in the process. The hunt is on to find and capture Chad before the public encounters this strange and dangerous creation. During Chad's escape, he wrestles with his natural child tendencies after befriending some local children and trying to control his wild primal inner instincts.

Cast
John Lynch as Peter Carson
Christine Kavanagh as Alison Wells
Kenneth Cranham as Hennessey
Peter Armitage as Sgt. Crichton
Emer Gillespie as Nurse Tracy Pickford
Sarah Winman as Julia
George Costigan as Schaffer
Pip Torrens as Windeler
David Calder as Dr. Jenner
Douglas Mann as Chad
Paul O'Grady as Social Worker
Sebastian Shaw as Dr Liawski
David Neilson Mr Desmond Gaskell.
Liza Tarbuck Women on National Express coach.
Maggie Lane Hotel Landlady
Dhirendra Cottrell
Gary Mavers Forester
Richard Durden Minister
Pippa Haywood Diane Rhomer
Vivien Parry Rental manager
Douglas Mann Chad Chimera

Release
The series originally aired in Britain on ITV in July 1991. In the United States, it aired on A&E Television Networks.

A heavily edited version of the series was released on VHS, with the title Monkey Boy, by Prism Entertainment.

The complete series was released on DVD in the United Kingdom by Revelation Films Ltd in July 2010.

The series was run for the first time on Forces TV on the 19 and 20 February 2022.

See also
 First Born (TV series)

References

External links 
 
 Monkey Boy on MSN Movies

1991 British television series debuts
1991 British television series endings
1990s British drama television series
1990s British television miniseries
1990s British science fiction television series
British horror fiction television series
English-language television shows
Television series about genetic engineering
Television shows based on British novels
ITV television dramas
Television series by ITV Studios
Television shows produced by Anglia Television
British fantasy television series